Italian Restaurant is an Italian comedy television series.

Cast
Gigi Proietti: Giulio Broccoli
Nancy Brilli: Connie Mancuso
Adriano Pappalardo: Frank Di Giacomo
Tiberio Murgia: Salvatore
Cristiana Capotondi: Angie
Luigi Montini: Mancuso
Carlo Molfese: Carmine Capurro
Giacomo Piperno: Gerard Lawrence
George Hilton: Goldsteen
Gianni Garko: Henken
Elena Presti: Anita
Corrado Olmi: Psicanalista 
Marisa Merlini: Cartomante

See also
List of Italian television series

External links
 

Italian television series
RAI original programming